Christopher is an extinct town in Chattahoochee County, in the U.S. state of Georgia. The GNIS classifies it as a populated place.

History
Christopher, like the nearby city of Columbus, was named after Christopher Columbus.

References

Geography of Chattahoochee County, Georgia
Ghost towns in Georgia (U.S. state)